Kentucky Route 66 (KY 66) is a  state highway in southeastern Kentucky. The route runs from Oneida in Clay County to Pineville in Bell County.

Major intersections

References

External links
 
 
 
KentuckyRoads.com KY 66
KentuckyRoads.com Images along KY 66

0066
Transportation in Bell County, Kentucky
Transportation in Clay County, Kentucky
Transportation in Leslie County, Kentucky
Pineville, Kentucky